Cory DeVante Williams (born November 9, 1992), known online as CoryxKenshin, is an American YouTuber. Williams joined YouTube in 2009. Known for his comedic playthroughs of horror games, Williams was ranked the fourth top creator in the United States in 2021. , his channel has over fifteen million subscribers.

On August 24, 2022, Williams uploaded a video onto his channel alleging that "racism and favoritism" may influence YouTube's review process. In the video, he recounted an incident where a reviewer age-restricted his video of the horror game The Mortuary Assistant (2022), thereby lessening his visibility and monetization. As many other videos featuring the same content were not subject to the same restrictions, Williams felt unfairly targeted. Numerous other YouTubers voiced their support online, and the video reached No. 1 on the trending tab.

Internet career 
Williams began uploading videos to YouTube in 2009. Although he originally created comedy sketches, Williams began to play popular horror games such as Five Nights at Freddy's (2014) and Bloodborne (2015) instead. He also plays other video games and triple-A games such as Elden Ring (2022).  His video of the rhythm game Friday Night Funkin' (2020) became the fifth most-viewed video in the United States in 2021. IGN Africa described the video as "part music video, part playthrough" and praised Williams' use of comedy in the video. Besides his let's plays, Williams is known for his humor and energetic, light-hearted personality.

He also went on to create Spooky Scary Sunday, which is a collection of his reactions to horror content on YouTube, both animated, live-action, or otherwise. The series has been running on the channel since August 2018.

Williams was ranked the fourth top creator in the United States in 2021 by subscriber growth and many of his videos have stayed on the YouTube trending tab for several days. He takes frequent hiatuses from his YouTube channel; at one point, he did not post any new videos for two years. However, he managed to reach ten million subscribers despite being in a period of inactivity and, his channel has over fifteen million subscribers.

Williams has been dubbed "THE SHOGUN HIMSELF" by his fanbase, as well as "THE ANKLE BREAKER".

YouTube: Racism and Favoritism 

On August 24, 2022, Williams uploaded a video onto his channel alleging that "racism and favoritism" may influence YouTube's review process. In the video, he recounted an incident where a reviewer age-restricted his video of the horror game The Mortuary Assistant (2022), thereby lessening his visibility and monetization. As many other videos featuring the same content were not subject to the same restrictions, Williams became confused and submitted an appeal, which was rejected. He sent a clip of a more popular YouTuber, Markiplier, playing the same game to his partner program representative. Although he expected them to restrict Markiplier's video, YouTube instead unrestricted the video.

Feeling targeted that they had to use Markiplier's clip to confirm that he had not disobeyed the content policy, Williams again contacted his representative, who inquired to the policy team. The company then restricted every video on the platform of The Mortuary Assistant. This led Williams to conclude that the company's favoritism of larger creators—or even, possibly, racism—were factors in reviewers' decisions. He also was unsure if it was an automated or human reviewer who restricted his video in the first place.

Numerous other YouTubers, including Jacksepticeye, Ludwig, Phillip DeFranco and Cr1TiKaL, voiced their support online. The video later peaked at No. 1 on the trending tab.

Williams has a history of leaving for around 4–6 months but returning. As of December 2022, he is active on YouTube.

Personal life 
According to Distractify, Williams resides in South Lyon, Michigan. He is openly Christian.

References

External links 
 Official website
 CoryxKenshin on YouTube
 CoryxKenshin on Spotify

YouTube channels launched in 2009
American YouTubers
People from Michigan
1992 births
Living people
Gaming YouTubers
Video game commentators
Let's Players
African-American Christians